José Alberto Fernandez nicknamed El Chepo (born April 28, 1972 in Corozal) is a retired Honduran footballer.

External links
Finalmente, Chepo poderá jogar - JC Online
El Chepo no se apena de quién es ahora - Diez - Diario Deportivo

Honduran footballers
Honduras international footballers
Sport Club do Recife players
Honduran expatriate footballers
Expatriate footballers in Brazil
1970 births
Living people
Association football defenders
1996 CONCACAF Gold Cup players